The 2020 Lory Meagher Cup is the 12th staging of the Lory Meagher Cup, the Gaelic Athletic Association's fifth tier inter-county hurling championship.

This year's cup was contested between Cavan, Fermanagh and Louth. Lancashire were supposed to compete in the competition; however, they didn't due to the impact of the COVID-19 pandemic on Gaelic games. The championship was scheduled to begin in May but will take place in October and November.

The previous year's cup was won by Leitrim after defeating Lancashire in the final. Leitrim advanced to the 2020 Nicky Rackard Cup. Louth were relegated from the 2019 Nicky Rackard Cup after losing a relegation playoff against Monaghan.

 were the winners, defeating  in the final.

Group stage

Table
{| class="wikitable" style="text-align:center"
!width=20|
!width=150 style="text-align:left;"|Team
!width=20|
!width=20|
!width=20|
!width=20|
!width=30|
!width=50|
!width=20|
!width=20|
!Qualification
|- style="background:#ccffcc" 
|1|| align="left" |  Fermanagh||2||1||1||0||3-26||2-28||+1||3
| rowspan="2" |Advance to Knockout Stage
|- style="background:#ccffcc"
|2|| align="left" |  Louth||2||1||0||1||2-29||3-26||0||2
|- 
|3||align=left| Cavan||2||0||1||1||1-29||1-30||–1||1
|
|}

Round 1

Round 2

Round 3

Knockout stage

Final

Statistics

Top scorers
Overall

In a single game

References

Nicky Rackard Cup
Lory Meagher Cup
Lory Meagher Cup